The 2008 Canadian federal election  was held on October 14, 2008, to elect members to the House of Commons of Canada of the 40th Canadian Parliament after the previous parliament had been dissolved by Governor General Michaëlle Jean on September 7, 2008.

The election resulted in a second but stronger minority government for the Conservative Party, led by the incumbent Prime Minister, Stephen Harper. While the Tories were a dozen seats away from a majority government, the Liberal Party led by Stéphane Dion lost 18 seats as the New Democratic Party and the Bloc Québécois made slight gains. The Green Party failed to win any seats and lost its only Member of Parliament. Following the election, a coalition attempt among the Liberal Party and New Democratic Party emerged but was unsuccessful.

Background

In 2007, Parliament passed a law fixing federal election dates every four years and scheduling the next election date as October 19, 2009, but the law did not limit the powers of the Governor General to dissolve Parliament at any time, such as when opposition parties bring down the government on a vote of confidence. In this election there was no loss of a non-confidence vote, but the Prime Minister asked the Governor General to call an election.  The Governor General granted the Prime Minister's request.

2006 election
64.7% of eligible voters cast ballots in the 2006 federal election. The Conservative Party received the most votes of any single party, with 36% of the vote, and won 124 seats (127 at dissolution). The Liberal Party won fewer seats than in 2004 – 103 seats (96 at dissolution), and 30% of the vote. The Bloc Québécois lost three seats, lowering its total to 51 seats (48 at dissolution), with 10.5% of the vote. The NDP retained its seats held at the dissolution of Parliament, and won 11 more, making its total 29 seats (30 at dissolution), with 17.5% of the vote. The Green Party received 4.5% of the vote, a minimal increase from the previous election, but did not win any seats (1 at dissolution). Independents and other parties constituted 1% of the total vote with one independent winning a seat.

Events since the 2006 election

Since the 2006 election, seven Members of Parliament (MPs) had changed party: David Emerson, Wajid Khan, and Joe Comuzzi from Liberal to Conservative; Garth Turner from Conservative to Independent to Liberal; Blair Wilson from Liberal to Independent to Green; Louise Thibault from Bloc Québécois to Independent; and Bill Casey from Conservative to Independent. In by-elections, the NDP gained one seat from the Liberal Party, while the Conservative Party gained two seats, one from the Liberals and one from the Bloc Québécois. Four seats were vacant when the election was called: three previously held by the Liberal Party, one by the Bloc Québécois.

The parliament preceding this election was led by the Conservatives, who governed with the smallest plurality ever in the Canadian House of Commons, just 40.6% of the seats. Although the average length of a minority parliament in Canada is 1 year, 5 months, and 22 days (measured from the return of the writs after an election to the dissolution of that parliament), minorities led by the former Progressive Conservative Party have been much shorter: the longest previous Conservative minority was just 6 months and 19 days. The 39th Parliament became Canada's longest serving Conservative minority on October 24, 2006.

On May 30, 2006, the Conservatives tabled Bill C-16, which would amend the Canada Elections Act to provide fixed election dates. The bill received royal assent on May 3, 2007. The bill states that there will be an election in 2009, and it would be the first to have a fixed election date, the third Monday in October (October 19, 2009). Despite the bill, on September 7, 2008, the Prime Minister sought the dissolution of the 39th Parliament, and the Governor General agreed to hold a general election on October 14, 2008.

On February 15, 2007, The Globe and Mail reported that the Conservatives were preparing for an election expected to be called shortly after the 2007 budget, due on March 19, 2007. Part of the reason for the timing of the election was given as strengthening Conservative poll numbers coupled with the desire to take advantage of the perception that Harper has "better leadership qualities than Liberal counterpart Stéphane Dion".

On March 17, 2007, an internal Conservative Party memo was leaked to The Canadian Press, telling members that they "need to be ready to campaign within the next week". The memo asked members to donate $75 to $150 to help to fund the early stages of the election campaign. None of these predictions for a federal election to occur in 2007 proved true, but the majority of pundits still believed a federal election would be triggered before the fixed election date of October 19, 2009, for sometime in 2008.

Stephen Harper hinted at the possibility of dissolving parliament on August 14, 2008. Speaking in Newfoundland and Labrador, he cited Stéphane Dion as the main player in making Parliament become increasingly "dysfunctional". "I'm going to have to make a judgment in the next little while as to whether or not this Parliament can function productively," Harper said. This came after repeated confidence votes that resulted in the NDP and Bloc parties not voting in favour of the government, and the Liberal Party voting in favour or not attending the vote. Rumours of a possible fall election were further fuelled by Harper's announcement of a fourth federal by-election for September 22 in the Toronto riding of Don Valley West.

On August 27, 2008, Harper asked Governor General Michaëlle Jean to cancel her trip to the Paralympic Games in Beijing, adding fuel to speculation that the Prime Minister would seek a dissolution. On September 7, 2008 after much speculation, Harper asked the Governor General to call a federal election on October 14, 2008.

Timeline

February 6, 2006: Harper Cabinet is sworn in.
May 3, 2007: Bill C-16 receives Royal Assent. This bill states that the next election must be held on October 19, 2009, unless there is an earlier dissolution.
August 26, 2008: Harper indicates he may call an election for the fall of 2008; Parliament could be dissolved as early as the week of September 1–6.
August 29, 2008: Harper meets with Gilles Duceppe, the leader of the Bloc Québécois in an attempt to find common ground between the Bloc and the Conservatives.
August 30, 2008:
 Former Liberal MP Blair Wilson joins the Green Party after being an Independent for nearly a year in the riding of West Vancouver—Sunshine Coast—Sea to Sky Country in British Columbia. Wilson becomes the first Member of Parliament for the Green Party.
 Harper meets with Jack Layton, the leader of the New Democrats in an attempt to find common ground between the NDP and the Conservatives.
September 1, 2008: Harper meets with Stéphane Dion, the leader of the Liberals, in an attempt to find common ground between the Liberals and the Conservatives, and avert the dissolution of Parliament, allowing the fall session to continue as planned. However, after a twenty-minute meeting at 24 Sussex Drive, the PM's official residence, Dion emerges stating there is no common ground between the two parties, and that an election is certain.
September 5, 2008: The Prime Minister's Office (PMO) announces that Prime Minister Stephen Harper will visit the Governor General at 9:00 am on September 7, 2008 to ask for the dissolution of the 39th Parliament and a general election on October 14, 2008.
September 7, 2008: Prime Minister Harper asks Governor General Michaëlle Jean to call a general election on October 14, 2008. She accepts the request.
October 14, 2008: Elections held for members of the House of Commons in the 40th Canadian Parliament.
November 4, 2008: Writs to be returned to the Chief Election Officer.
November 18, 2008: 40th Parliament summoned.
December 1, 2008: The Liberals and NDP sign agreement on proposed coalition government to replace the governing Conservatives under Prime Minister Harper.
December 1, 2008: The Liberals, NDP, and Bloc Québécois sign "policy accord" whereby the Bloc would support a Liberal/NDP government for at least 18 months.
December 4, 2008: Parliament prorogued by the Governor General during the parliamentary dispute on advice of the Prime Minister.
January 26, 2009: Parliament to reconvene for second session.

Pre-election

Prime Minister Stephen Harper said he was considering calling an election because of a lack of cooperation in Parliament, saying "all the signs indicate that this Parliament is at the end of its productiveness," while in Inuvik, Northwest Territories. The Conservative Party of Canada fueled rumours of an oncoming election when it released several campaign advertisements that focused on a range of issues, and attacked the Liberal Party of Canada for their proposed carbon tax. The Prime Minister's Office (PMO) confirmed that Harper would call an election for October 14 after meeting with New Democratic Party leader Jack Layton and Bloc Québécois leader Gilles Duceppe, which gave the Prime Minister little hope that a fall session of Parliament can be productive, PMO officials said. Senior government officials announced on the first of September that Stephen Harper would ask the Governor General, Michaëlle Jean, to dissolve parliament and call an election for October 14, after he met with Liberal leader Stéphane Dion who called the meeting a "charade". Dion said the two were unable to agree on how to make the upcoming session of Parliament, slated to begin September 15, more productive.

Liberal Party members gathered in Winnipeg on September 2, for a three-day caucus which changed from preparing for a new parliamentary session to a strategy session to formulate a plan to attack the Conservatives while healing internal party rifts that have surfaced in recent weeks. Conservatives began spending at least $60 million on pre-election funding projects to a wide variety of institutions and groups. A few announcements have been big, including Industry Minister Jim Prentice's pledge of $25 million for the expansion of the Northlands exhibition facility in Edmonton. But the Tories have also announced a number of smaller projects, including $40,000 for the 2008 55+ Games and $25,000 for the Peace Window of the Holy Trinity Anglican Church in Winnipeg. The announcements have also been spread out across the country. The Atlantic region is to get more than $500,000 for youth jobs and eight cultural organizations. The Association of Book Publishers of British Columbia will receive $81,000. Jack Layton attacked the Conservative Party as bribing the public and doing the same thing they used to complain about the Liberals doing before elections.

A survey conducted by Environics found that 38 per cent of Canadians would vote for the Conservative party if an election were held immediately, 28 per cent would vote for the Liberal party, 19 for the NDP, eight for the Bloc Québécois and seven for the Green party. The poll shows Conservatives taking early leads in Ontario, British Columbia and the Prairies. In Atlantic Canada, Liberals still hold a strong majority, while in Quebec the Bloc Québécois leads while the Conservatives and Liberals are almost tied for second. When asked, most Canadians said the Conservatives would handle the economy better, while most said the Liberals would handle the environment better.

On September 7, Harper officially asked for the dissolution of Parliament, and called for an election on October 14.

Election campaign
The 40th Canadian Federal Election campaign officially began at 8:20 a.m. Eastern Daylight Time when Governor General Michaëlle Jean accepted Stephen Harper's request to dissolve Parliament and call an election for October 14, 2008. The party leaders jumped right into the campaign, with Stéphane Dion attacking the Conservative's record, presenting the Liberal plan, and rejected the accusation by Harper that the Liberal party is a risky choice. Jack Layton took a more forceful approach than previous elections, in which the New Democratic Party has just tried to maintain a high number of seats in Parliament to influence government. Layton has made it clear he will campaign for the position of prime minister itself this time, but also returned to a longstanding NDP theme: alleged abuses by big business. He promised to stop what he called "ripoffs" by big oil, cellphone and banks, and his attacks are expected to focus on the Conservatives and all but ignore the Liberals. Elizabeth May of the Green Party said Canadians would care enough about the environment to vote for her party, as long as she was able to get into the television debates. Stephen Harper has stated his objection to including the Green Party into television debates because of the similar policies of the Green and Liberal party, and how it would be unfair. Bloc Québécois Leader Gilles Duceppe said the Conservatives must be prevented from winning a majority, and the BQ is the only party that can do that. Duceppe compared Harper to US President George W. Bush, and said the government is incompetent.

Leaders' Debates
The two Leaders' Debates of 2008, one each in French and English, included the leaders of five parties, Stephen Harper of the Conservatives, Stéphane Dion of the Liberals, Jack Layton of the NDP, Gilles Duceppe of the Bloc Québécois and Elizabeth May of the Green Party.

The French-language debate aired on Wednesday, October 1 from 8 to 10 p.m. EDT, moderated by Stéphan Bureau, a journalist and host. The English-language debate aired Thursday, October 2 from 9 to 11 p.m. EDT, with Steve Paikin of TVOntario as moderator.

Participation

Three parties — the Conservatives, the Bloc Québécois and the NDP — opposed the inclusion of the Green Party, citing statements made by Green Party leader Elizabeth May to the effect that the best outcome of the election would be a Liberal-led government, and a deal struck between the Green Party and Liberals where the Liberals would not run in May's riding, Central Nova, and the Green party in Liberal leader Stéphane Dion's riding, Saint-Laurent—Cartierville, which they say make May a "second Liberal candidate".

Stephen Harper and Jack Layton are reported to have said that if the Green Party were included, they would not participate in the Leaders' Debates. Dion said that while he supports May's inclusion, he would not attend if Harper does not, and the Bloc Québécois has stated it will not boycott the debates if May is included. The media consortium in charge of the debate, made up of the CBC, CTV, Global Television and TVA, had decided that it would prefer to broadcast the debates with the four major party leaders, rather than risk not at all or with minimal participation. The Green Party indicated they had begun procedures to lodge a formal complaint with the Canadian Radio-television and Telecommunications Commission, as they have in past federal elections.

On September 10, Harper and Layton released statements that they would not oppose May's inclusion in the debate, citing public backlash and protests — with neither acknowledging making the threat of boycotting the debate — and that the media consortium would reconvene to discuss the matter. Layton stated that "debating about the debate" had become a "distraction", and that he had only one condition, that Stephen Harper be there. In response, spokespeople for Stephen Harper announced they would not stand alone in opposition to the Green Party's inclusion in the debates and also changed their position on the matter. Later that day the consortium announced that May would be allowed to participate in the debate.

Format change
On September 30, Harper announced that he would ask for the 12 minutes on the economy scheduled for the Leader's Debate to be extended to an hour, citing that the financial crisis affecting the U.S. "has deepened since the debate format was finalized", a change which would require agreement from the other parties in the debate to be approved. The NDP released a statement soon after that they supported the move, while public response has been concerned that other topics such as the environment would not end up with enough time to cover the issue.

On October 1, the day of the first debate, it was announced that both debates would get extended time, from 12 to 30 minutes, for the economy, and leaders would not give opening and closing statements, to allow for longer discussions on the economy without removing time from other topics. It was also revealed that instead of leaders standing at individual podiums for the debate, as had been done in past years, the debate would be done in a round table format.

Debates

French debate
Much of the French debate revolved around the economy and the environment, with the two topics repeatedly being brought up in discussions allotted for other topics. Stephen Harper came under criticism from every other leader in nearly every topic, especially the economy and environment, with the other party leaders stating that Harper's politics had led to Canada's current crises in those two areas. Their points included that Harper's environmental plan was considered the worst of all developed countries by organizations around the world, with Elizabeth May labeling it "a type of fraud," and that his attempts to remove regulations in the financial sectors, similar to those done by the Bush administration in the United States, have led Canada to being nearly as hard hit by the current financial crisis as the United States.

Continuous comparisons of Harper to George W. Bush were made over the course of the debate, with Jack Layton stating at one point that with Bush ending his presidency at the end of the year, Harper would be "the last leader of a developed country to follow the Bush doctrine".

English debate
Following the same tone as the French debate, much of the discussion revolved around the economy and the environment. The other four leaders keep criticizing Harper, especially for his lack of an economic platform despite asking for the format change to focus more on the economy in light of the ongoing financial crisis, and instead using the time to criticize the economic platforms of the other leaders. May lashed out at Harper for not understanding that Canadians were worried about their homes, jobs and finances, and comparing the current situation to Dutch disease, Dion stated that the only thing that keeps Canada from being hit as hard by the crisis as the US are laws created by the previous Liberal government that the Conservatives had been attempting to overturn, Duceppe repeatedly criticized Harper for financial practices and attitudes similar to the Bush administration, and Layton at one point stated that Harper's position showed he was either incompetent or uncaring to the situation, and asked which one he was, to which Harper did not respond. Harper also came under criticism for his laissez-faire attitude to the job sector, supporting primarily the oil companies and companies that outsource jobs in the manufacturing sector.

When it turned to the environment, the Carbon Tax proposal came up repeatedly, with both Dion and May supporting it, although May to more ambitious figures than Dion, pointing out it was the most recommended and proven way to deal with carbon emissions by countries and organizations around the world, noting the growth that Sweden and Germany have had with this system. Harper criticized the plan, saying would increase taxpayers' burden and that Dion should be "honest with the people" that some environmental measures will cost the economy and said the plan includes $40 billion in carbon taxes and $26 billion in tax cuts. Dion defended the Liberal's Green Shift, saying that "[Harper's statements are] not true at all", and that "for every dollar that we will raise, you will have a tax cut, and these tax cuts will be on your income". Duceppe commented that he would like targets to be applied to individual provinces, thereby allowing Quebec to financially benefit due to already-implemented greenhouse gas reductions. Layton, who favours a cap-and-trade system, said that it is a "figment of Mr. Harper's imagination" that emissions will fall under his plan. When Harper sought to outline his government's record on other environmental fronts, giving examples of his minority government supported the preservation of hundreds of thousands of hectares of environmentally sensitive land through the Nature Conservancy of Canada, and that the government declared a protected marine area by Lake Superior and created a whale sanctuary by Baffin Island, May responded by saying "The only word he said that's true is on national parks".

Layton also criticized Dion for his lack of accomplishments as official opposition during the minority government, and his party's previous leader's broken promises in areas such as Child Care and Pharmacare.

Duceppe painted the Conservative government's $45 million in national arts and culture funding cuts as an assault on the province's identity, saying "How can you recognize the Quebec nation and then cut culture [funding], which is the soul of a nation?" followed by citing the economic benefits of culture.

Harper also said he had erred in calling for Canada's participation in the 2003 U.S.-led invasion of Iraq, saying "It was absolutely an error, it's obviously clear", adding that the claim of weapons of mass destruction proved false.

Commenting on the debate, Layton said that he "thoroughly enjoyed" May's contributions to the debate. Reporter Julie Van Dusen said that Harper managed to take the hits calmly, as "someone must have told him ... if you fight back or get too partisan, you're going to alienate voters, especially women". Duceppe said he was happy to have forced Harper to admit his support of joining the Iraq war in 2003 was a mistake, adding he will use the admission in the campaign as "Exhibit A" that the Conservative leader lacks solid judgment skills, and that Harper was weakened when he confirmed he does not support a refundable tax credit for the manufacturing industry to encourage companies to improve productivity.

Issues

Arts
Stephen Harper had cut $45 million from arts funding while in office, a move that drew much criticism from the other leaders and Quebec citizens, with most leaders seeking to restore the funding. The Conservatives have stated that the money is being reallocated to other arts and cultural programs, including various official languages projects, the 400th anniversary of Quebec City and projects connected with the 2010 Vancouver-Whistler Winter Olympic Games, although the Conservative's refusal to have a parliamentary review of their cuts and for a moratorium on the measures until the House of Commons Heritage Committee had a chance to hold hearings on culture and arts funding has most opposition members calling foul.

Both Stéphane Dion and Jack Layton have promised to reverse the cut, with Dion also promising to increase funding to Canada Council for the Arts to $360 million, while Layton also promised to bring income averaging for artists to the national level and providing an annual tax exemption of $20,000 for income earned by copyright and residuals, stating that "one of the key things we must do, before we start giving $50-billion tax giveaways to banks and oil companies, is to protect and promote the arts" and "stable, sure and appropriate funding" for CBC/Radio-Canada while also protecting Telefilm Canada and the Canadian Television Fund.

Harper has said that he believes that the issue is a "niche topic", and that "ordinary Canadians" are not particularly concerned with the issue. A group of Canadian performers, which included Art Hindle, Wendy Crewson and Gordon Pinsent, held a press conference on September 24, saying the cuts would cripple the Canadian arts industry.

On September 29, Harper unveiled a new tax credit plan worth an estimated $150 million a year to encourage parents to enroll their kids in arts programs like music and drama. The credit will apply on up to $500 of eligible fees for children under 16 who participate in eligible arts activities. Harper said that "[the Conservatives] spend a lot more on culture and arts" but "in a way that we ensure is an effective use of taxpayers' money and ultimately, in this case, benefits families and all of society as well". Harper has come under criticism when the week before he expressed his opinion that "ordinary working people were unable to relate to taxpayer-subsidized cultural elites when they see them at a rich gala on television".

Alleged Cadman bribe attempt

In early 2008 it was alleged that Independent MP Chuck Cadman of Surrey North, who was terminally ill with cancer at the time, had been offered a million dollar life insurance policy in exchange for voting against the proposed Liberal budget in May 2005, which he turned down. Under section 119 of the Criminal Code, it is illegal to bribe an MP. Accordingly, Opposition Liberal party Intergovernmental Affairs critic Dominic LeBlanc asked the Royal Canadian Mounted Police (RCMP) in February 2008 to investigate this allegation. In May 2008, the RCMP announced that there was not enough evidence to support charges.
Cadman died in July. The following month, Harper stated in a court deposition that any such million-dollar offer would have to be authorized by him, and that he did not issue any such authorization. There is currently an ongoing legal battle between the Liberals and the Conservatives over the matter.

On September 24, while campaigning in Surrey North, Stephen Harper's campaign team barred reporters from talking with the local Conservative candidate, Dona Cadman, who is Chuck Cadman's widow. The campaign team called in the Royal Canadian Mounted Police (RCMP), and ordered them to "Keep [the reporters] out" while Cadman was taken away by staff. Harper spokesman Kory Teneycke later stated that he had not seen the incident, but the local candidates did not need to be interviewed, that "Local candidates' priority is campaigning in their local ridings, and not talking to the national media", and that it should be enough that they hold daily news conferences with the party's most prominent members.

The incident has reminded people of Conservative tactics during the 2006 election, where attempts by the media to speak with local candidates were stopped by campaign personnel, especially the Harold Albrecht incident, where campaign officials forced Albrecht to stay in a restaurant kitchen when journalists attempted to interview him.

The Conservatives chose former U.S. Federal Bureau of Investigation agent Bruce Koenig to analyze a tape of reporter Tom Zytaruk interviewing Harper on the Cadman bribe attempt. The tape was a key piece of evidence in the ongoing legal battle. On October 10, Koenig announced that the tape had not been altered in any way, contrary to the claims by Stephen Harper that it had been altered.

Canadian involvement in Afghanistan

The ongoing involvement of the Canadian Forces in Afghanistan may also influence voters. Desmond Morton, a political science professor at McGill University suggested that the Conservatives could be blamed for the war because they have extended the mission twice, despite the fact that it was then Liberal Leader Jean Chrétien who was Canada's prime minister when Canada's current military involvement in Afghanistan first started in 2001. Both the Conservatives and Liberals have at various times agreed to extend the mission(s) to at least 2011, so this may result in some Canadians who are strongly against Canada's ongoing involvement, who might have otherwise typically voted either Liberal or Conservative in the past, to take their votes elsewhere in 2008.

Cities and infrastructure
Toronto Mayor David Miller has spoken out that the parties need to focus more on cities and their infrastructure, stating that 8 out of 10 Canadians live in cities, and that so far only the Green party has revealed a platform on the issue, with a national transit strategy and plans to give cities a permanent revenue source to help fix a growing infrastructure backlog. Miller stated he will not endorse a specific party, but urges people to choose a party that will "help cities thrive". He disagrees with Stephen Harper's opinion that "cities are not of national importance".

On September 18, Stéphane Dion pledged to spend more than $70 billion over the next 10 years to improve Canada's infrastructure if elected, and budget surpluses that exceed a $3-billion contingency fund to infrastructure projects, particularly those with a green focus, calling Canada's cities and towns "the engines of our economy". Stephen Harper immediately lashed out at the spending proposal, saying Dion was "promising money no government could afford" and that the Conservative's infrastructure plans "are modest and affordable within the four-year budget we've published".

On September 23, Montreal and Toronto mayors Gérald Tremblay and David Miller laid out their demands for urban municipalities, describing cities' current financial problems as a national issue, saying that cities have become the country's economic, social and cultural development engines and need appropriate support, and that they need better "fiscal tools" to continue their role as Canada's economic engines or the country will suffer. They listed Homelessness, traffic gridlock, crowded buses and overstretched police departments as just a few of the symptoms, that "These problems are too big and too important to be solved on the backs of property taxpayers" and that "in order to remain competitive, transport goods efficiently and attract new talent, our cities require quality infrastructure, affordable housing and first-rate recreational and cultural facilities". Jean Perrault, president of the Federation of Canadian Municipalities and mayor of Sherbrooke, Quebec, has stated that things like the Federal Gas Tax Fund were an important federal commitment, but that more is needed to tackle cities' overwhelming infrastructure needs.

On September 29, Layton announced plans to direct one cent per litre of the gas tax, approximately $400 million a year, into transit projects across the country, and direct $350 million from the sale of carbon permits to big polluters, saying that "the major polluters would be the ones paying to make transit greener, not you and your families", and that "fighting climate change requires investing in transit, and that's what our plan does".

Economy
Polls have suggested that the economy is the major issue going into this election, especially with the resulting high price of gas, along with rising prices of other goods and services, such as food, and the possible impact the current financial crisis may have on Canada. Some experts say that Canada has just narrowly dodged a recession, although the economy is in its worst shape since 1991.

Both Dion and Harper have said that the others' plans will lead Canada into a recession, while Dion also stated that Harper has "mismanaged a once-booming economy into one with growth dropping to among the lowest of the G8 nations".

The Conservatives have stated possible negative consequences that could happen to the economy based on Liberal election promises if they were to be elected. As of September 20, 2008, Liberal election promises have totaled in excess of $80 billion spending over the next decade.  In contrast, the cost of programs promised by the Conservatives to date is less than $2 billion annually. Stephen Harper, the Prime Minister, has criticized the Liberal's spending promises, saying they are making "mind-boggling" spending plans that he predicts would send Canada into deficit.

After the rejection of the proposed bailout of the United States financial system and resulting market fluctuation all over the world, including the Toronto Stock Exchange, Jack Layton called for Harper to call a special meeting for federal party leaders to discuss the potential effects of the U.S economic crisis on Canadians, suggestion the afternoon of October 1, since all leaders would be in Ottawa for the first Leaders' Debate that night. A spokesman for Harper later reported that Harper would not call such a meeting, and to save discussion for the Leader's Debate, as "[they] will have an opportunity later this week to debate—not behind closed doors but in front of all Canadians—the issues at stake not [just] for our economy but for our country". Harper later announced that he would ask for the 12 minutes on the economy scheduled for the Leader's Debate to be extended to an hour, citing that the financial crisis affecting the U.S. "has deepened since the debate format was finalized", a change which would require agreement from the other parties in the debate to be approved. The NDP released a statement soon after that they supported the move, while public response has been concerned that other topics such as the environment would not end up with enough time to cover the issue. All the leaders supported the idea, and the opening and closing statements were dropped and the allotted time for the economy extended to 30 minutes without affecting the other topics.

During the Leaders' Debates Harper repeatedly came under fire for lack of an economic plan in the current time of crisis and while campaigning, and for his lack of ability to explain how he would deal with the current crisis, merely repeating that Canada was unlikely to face such a crisis as he had made "different choices" than the US while in power without being able to explain what those different choices were, as all of his examples were immediately compared to practices done by the Bush administration, and insisted that Canadians "don't panic". In response to mounting pressure from the public, Harper announced on October 3 that he would reveal his party's platform, including economic matters, on October 7, one week before the election.

Environment

In return, the Conservatives criticized the Liberal party's decision to use a 29-year-old Boeing 737-200 for campaigning, saying that the older airplane's poor fuel efficiency demonstrates hypocrisy on environmental matters. Daniel Lauzon, a spokesperson for the Liberals, denied their airplane was substantially less efficient than the Conservatives' Airbus A319.

The Tories have been previously criticized for backing out of Canada's commitments under the Kyoto Protocol. Their new plan requires industries to reduce the rate at which they generate greenhouse gases, with a goal of reducing overall emissions by 45 to 65 percent by 2050. The plan has been criticized by groups such as the Sierra Club, who called it "completely inadequate". Criticism has focused on the use of "intensity-based" targets, for which emission reductions are relative to overall production, so overall emissions could potentially increase if production also increases. This is in contrast to a "hard cap" on emissions, for which the overall amount cannot increase. The Conservatives' plan includes a hard cap to begin in 2020 or 2025, while environmental groups have advocated for an immediate hard cap.

The Liberals have developed a "Green Shift" plan, creating a carbon tax that will be coupled with reductions to income tax rates. The proposal was to tax greenhouse gas emissions, starting at $10 (Canadian) per ton of CO2 and reaching $40 (Canadian) per ton within four years. The plan would engage in revenue recycling by matching the tax with reductions in the income tax. Criticism of the Green Shift plan has focused on its economic effects, with the Conservatives predicting it would cause a "big recession". When pressed by reporters to provide evidence of this impact, Harper "wasn't able to cite a study that specifically modelled the impact of the Liberal Green Shift plan", instead citing an older economic model about the implementation of the Kyoto Protocol.

One trucking association claimed the Liberal carbon tax plan could put up to 10,000 jobs in jeopardy in Moncton alone. Environmental activist David Suzuki has come out in support of Dion's plan, saying "To oppose [the carbon tax plan], it's just nonsense. It's certainly the way we got to go" and giving an interview explaining why it is the most effective way to solve the environmental crisis.

The NDP's plan for the environment has focused on emissions trading, claiming their system will decrease greenhouse emissions by 80% by 2050. The plan includes a series of financial incentives to retrofit public transit systems and transition the economy to be "green-collar". The plan would also halt new oil sands development until emissions have been capped. Layton has also criticized the Liberal carbon tax plan, stating it taxes families instead of polluters.

Equalization

Danny Williams, the Progressive Conservative premier of Newfoundland and Labrador, launched a campaign called Anything But Conservative, primarily targeted at Harper and the federal Conservatives. He opposes a Conservative majority, due in part to Harper's promise during the 2006 election to modify the equalization formula to fully share offshore oil revenues with the province, which Williams says Harper has broken, and what Harper has stated he will do with a majority government. Accordingly, all but one member of the provincial PC caucus supported not voting Conservative in this election.

Leo Power, a veteran of federal politics and the Conservative Party of Canada's campaign co-chair for Newfoundland and Labrador, said raising money and recruiting volunteers has proved difficult, and blames Williams's ABC campaign, saying it has cut deep into the federal election machine that is struggling to compete. Power has also said his party's best hope of winning a seat in the province is in the riding of Avalon with incumbent candidate Fabian Manning. Manning was defeated by Liberal Scott Andrews, while St. John's East and St. John's South—Mount Pearl, which were represented by Conservatives not running for re-election, were won by the NDP and Liberals, respectively, leaving the Conservatives with no representatives in Newfoundland and Labrador.

Leadership
Since before the election was announced, the Conservative party ran attack ads about Dion, saying he was not a capable leader. Dion criticized the Conservatives for running the ads.

On October 9, Stephen Harper called into question the abilities of Liberal leader Dion after footage from the false starts of an interview on CTV Atlantic, and later rebroadcast on Mike Duffy Live, were aired to the public, and criticized Dion's grasp of the English language and the strength of the Liberals' plan for the Canadian economy. In the footage Dion repeatedly failed to understand the conditional perfect construction used by the interviewer in a single repeatedly asked question.

The footage shows interviewer Steve Murphy asking Dion the question: "If you were the Prime Minister now, what would you have done about the economy, and this crisis, that Mr. Harper has not done?".  Dion had difficulty in understanding the question, repeatedly asking Murphy to clarify if he meant if Dion was Prime Minister now, next Tuesday on election day, last week, last month, 60 weeks ago, or two and a half years ago.  Eventually, after three start overs to the interview, Dion responded with what he would do if elected Prime Minister in the future. CTV initially agreed to restart the interviews and not air the false starts but changed their minds and announced that they felt it was their responsibility to show it. Harper responded to the clips by saying that "When you're running a trillion-and-a-half-dollar economy you don't get a chance to have do-overs, over and over again" and "What this incident actually indicates very clearly is Mr. Dion and the Liberal Party really don't know what they would do on the economy", and when told that the difficulties were in part due to English being Dion's second language, Harper said: "I don't think this is a question of language at all. The question was very clear. It was asked repeatedly".

Mark Dunn, a spokesman for Dion, accused the Tories of making fun of the Liberal leader's hearing issues. Dion responded to Harper's comments, saying Harper had "no class", saying "I did not understand the question", and "Maybe it's because I have a hearing problem, maybe because [English is] my second language, but I did not understand the question". Both the Conservatives and the CTV have come under criticism for their handling of the footage, but they have stated they stand by their actions. Duceppe has called Harper's comments a "double standard", saying that many English-speaking politicians have little or no ability to speak French, yet francophones are somehow always expected to be perfect, and that the attack was an attempted "low blow".  But Duceppe also took the opportunity to criticise Dion, suggesting he understood the question.  "The real question is that I think Dion understood the question.  The real problem wasn't the language, it was the substance," Duceppe said, "He had nothing to say". Layton also defended Dion, saying he has "struggled with questions, too".

Former Prime Minister Jean Chrétien has come out criticizing Harper's leadership abilities, noting especially Harper's controlling ways with his cabinet ministers, saying he would have quit if former prime minister Pierre Elliott Trudeau had treated him that way, that "Mr. Dion was a minister for nine years. And Mr. Harper arrived there with no experience and it shows", that the phrase 'Tory times are bad times', in use since the 1930s, was still true and that "Harper destroyed 50 years of relationships with China", Canada's second biggest trading partner after the US, noting both past Liberal and Progressive Conservative governments sought to maintain its dealings with the key trading partner. Former Prime Minister Paul Martin has also supported Dion's plans and abilities, and many have noted Dion's ability to get both Chrétien and Martin to support him, despite Chrétien and Martin's ongoing feud.

Listeriosis outbreak

The Minister of Agriculture Gerry Ritz, who has already been criticized by Canada's food scientists for his handling of the 2008 listeriosis outbreak, has also been criticized for making inappropriate comments, further angering the families of those affected. Ritz had joked about the outbreak while he was on a conference call with scientists and political staffers on August 30, saying the political fallout from the outbreak was "like a death by a thousand cuts, or should I say cold cuts". In addition, when he was informed of a listeriosis-related death in Prince Edward Island, he quipped: "Please tell me it's [Liberal agriculture critic] Wayne Easter". Despite calls for Ritz's resignation from the other parties and the public, Stephen Harper has supported Ritz and rebuffed calls for his resignation.

The Public Service Alliance of Canada revealed to the media that the Conservative party plans to cut federal funding to meat inspection programs by $3 million, effectively ending their operation in Manitoba, Saskatchewan and British Columbia.

Speech plagiarism
On September 30, it was revealed by Bob Rae of the Liberal Party that on March 20, 2003, Stephen Harper had plagiarized a speech that called for troops to be deployed to Iraq to assist the US invasion from Australian Prime Minister John Howard, which Howard had delivered two days before, on March 18.

Following Rae's statement, Harper's spokesman Kory Teneycke dismissed the issue as irrelevant, saying "I'm not going to get into a debate about a five-year-old speech that was delivered three Parliaments ago, two elections ago, when the prime minister was the leader of a party that no longer exists".

The Canadian Alliance staff member and former Fraser Institute policy analyst, Owen Lippert, who wrote that speech was working on the current election campaign at Conservative campaign headquarters. On September 30, 2008 he issued a statement and resigned as a result of the incident.

He stated:

On October 3, there was a second plagiarism allegation from the Liberals, who said that Harper had copied several sentences from a speech by former Ontario premier Mike Harris. Harper denied the allegation, saying "we're talking about a couple of sentences of fairly standard political rhetoric".

On October 6, the Conservatives contended that Dion had also committed plagiarism when, as Minister of the Environment in 2005, he went to a United Nations conference on climate change to deliver a speech which had substantial similarities to the executive summary of a year old UN report.  The Liberal party did not respond to the plagiarism allegation.

Controversies

Missing ballot boxes

In Quebec City, several ballot boxes containing votes from advance polls disappeared after the close of advance polling on October 7. The boxes were stored in a closet at the home of a deputy returning officer. Although there was no tampering of the boxes or the votes, three deputy returning officers were fired. Deputy returning officers are the only polling officials allowed to handle ballots during the vote count and the law did allow for them to store the sealed boxes as may be necessary in large remote rural ridings.  However the boxes were returned a day late after the riding returning officer ordered their return.

Strategic voting
A number of political leaders and popular websites supported strategic voting in the election, mostly against the Conservative Party. The reasons varied from regional, such as Newfoundland and Labrador premier Danny Williams and his "Anything But Conservative" campaign, to ideological. The popular website VoteForEnvironment.ca, which received over one million page views in the first 12 days of its existence and whose founders were interviewed on CBC and other mainstream media, showed regional breakdowns per riding and offered recommendations based on which candidate was most likely to beat the Conservative candidate. If the Conservative candidate had little chance of winning the riding or was strongly entrenched, the site recommended "vote with your heart". Similarly, a vote swapping organization on Facebook entitled "Anti-Harper Vote Swap Canada" also gained press. The premise of that organization is that eligible voters in different electoral districts may exchange their votes, so that an opponent of a Conservative candidate in each district might have a better chance of being elected in that district. Elections Canada deemed the practice legal.

Green Party leader Elizabeth May sent out mixed signals about strategic voting. On October 12, she recommended that in close ridings, supporters of green policies should consider voting for the NDP or Liberals to defeat the Conservatives, but on the same day she said: "I do not support strategic voting and I have not advised voters to choose any candidate other than Green". In addition, during the final days of the campaign the Liberals attempted to attract strategic NDP and Green votes to stop the Conservatives, and the Conservatives attempted to attract Bloc votes to stop the Liberals.

Voter identification

Some students, homeless, and transient voters were turned away at the polls when they were unable to provide identification showing or otherwise confirming a place of residence. Legislation introduced in 2007 requires all voters to show one or two pieces of identification which confirm the voter's name and address, or to be vouched for by another voter who is able to show such identification.

Voter turnout

Voter turnout at 58.8% was the lowest in Canadian election history. All federally funded parties except for the Greens attracted fewer total votes than in 2006; the Greens received nearly 280,000 more votes. The Conservatives lost about 170,000 votes, the Liberals 850,000, the Bloc 170,000 and the NDP 70,000.  Some voters were at first turned away because of failure to meet new and stricter proof of address requirements, including 2/3 of those attempting to vote at Dalhousie University, for example. The effect this may have had on voter turnout is unknown.

Judicial recounts

In a federal election, a judicial recount is automatically ordered in a riding where the margin of victory is less than 0.1% (one one-thousandth) of the votes cast. In cases where there is a larger but still narrow margin of victory, an elector can request a judicial recount.

Judicial recounts were ordered in six ridings. In one case, Brossard—La Prairie, the judicial recount overturned the reported victor, giving the seat to the Liberals' Alexandra Mendès instead of the Bloc incumbent Marcel Lussier.

In four other ridings, the recount confirmed the election results, although Liberal Ujjal Dosanjh's margin in Vancouver South was reduced from 33 votes to just 20. This was the slimmest victory of any riding in the entire election, until the results of the Kitchener-Waterloo recount reduced Peter Braid's margin of victory to a mere 17 votes. Dosanjh's Conservative opponent, Wai Young, appealed the recount to the Supreme Court of British Columbia, citing that not all of the ballot boxes were fully recounted. All ballots were eventually counted by November 4, confirming Dosanjh's victory by 20 votes, after the initial partial recount indicated a margin of 22 votes.

In a sixth riding, the recount was cancelled when the elector who had requested it withdrew the request.

Candidates

Conservative
Chris Reid, the Conservative candidate from Toronto Centre, resigned over controversial statements on his blog, which advocated revising Canadian gun control legislation to legalize concealed carriage of handguns. He was replaced by David Gentili.

The Conservatives apologized after an aide to Pontiac candidate Lawrence Cannon told Aboriginal protesters that they were free to meet with Cannon "if you behave and you're sober and there's no problems and if you don't do a sit down and whatever".

Liberal
Liberal candidate Simon Bédard was also asked to resign after he reiterated his 1990 comments, suggesting that lethal force should have been used in the Oka Crisis.

Liberal candidate Lesley Hughes was dropped by the Liberal Party after making controversial comments about the September 11, 2001 attacks.  She continued to campaign as an independent, though she appeared as a Liberal on the ballot.

NDP
Andrew McKeever, an NDP candidate in Durham, announced on October 3 that he would resign from the election campaign after it was revealed that he had posted comments on Facebook in which he called one war activist a "fascist bitch" and threatened to beat up another person. Mr. McKeever wrote comments peppered with expletives and calling the operators of a war resister website "Nazis." McKeever was also quoted as saying "I like the part in Schindler's List when the guard starts waxing the prisoners." McKeever's decision to drop out of the race came with just over a week left in the campaign, meaning his name would remain on the ballot. One week before the publication of McKeever's resignation, NDP leader Jack Layton defended McKeever and refused to make him step down.

Julian West, the candidate for the riding of Saanich—Gulf Islands, dropped out of the race after details surfaced about an environmental event he attended 12 years ago when he went skinny-dipping and asked two teenagers to body-paint him. Two other candidates in British Columbia who were proponents of marijuana decriminalization — Dana Larsen and Kirk Tousaw — resigned earlier after videos they had produced for Internet site Pot-TV were released to the media. One of the videos, filmed in 2000, showed Mr. Larsen, former leader of the BC Marijuana Party, preparing to light up a joint before driving a car, after having taken the short-acting hallucinogenic drug DMT earlier in the evening.

Green
John Shavluk, the Green candidate in Newton—North Delta, was removed from the party's slate of candidates on September 4, just before the election call, after it was revealed that he had previously published comments in his blog about the September 11 attacks in 2001, in which he referred to the World Trade Center as "the shoddily built Jewish world bank headquarters".  He was replaced by Liz Walker as the Green Party candidate, but remained on the ballot as an independent.

Independent
At an all-candidates debate staged for a high school student audience in Sudbury on September 29, independent candidate David Popescu responded to a question about same-sex marriage by stating that "homosexuals should be executed". His remarks were widely criticized across Canada, and the Greater Sudbury Police Service announced an investigation into whether the comments constituted a crime under Canadian hate speech legislation. He was subsequently investigated by the Toronto Police as well, after a radio interview on October 2 in which he specifically advocated the execution of Egale Canada executive director Helen Kennedy.

Vandalism
Supporters of Ontario Liberal MPs Carolyn Bennett (St. Paul's) and Gerard Kennedy (Parkdale—High Park) who had Liberal signs outside their houses were subject to vandalism during the later hours of October 3, including graffiti, phone and cable lines being cut, and damage to vehicles that included brake cutting. Toronto police reported over 30 incidents of vandalism as of October 6. Some of the victims did not realize their brakes had been cut until they were in traffic, and there was at least one near-accident. Liberal Senator Jerry Grafstein was one of the residents who reported vandalism to his car.

Vandalism was also reported at the campaign offices of Trinity—Spadina Liberal candidate Christine Innes and Beaches—East York New Democratic Party candidate Marilyn Churley, as well as in Niagara Falls.

Legality of the election

After the election was called, Democracy Watch, an Ottawa-based advocacy group, filed a legal suit claiming that the election call was illegal because it violated the 2007 amendments to the Canada Elections Act. These amendments, introduced by the Harper government, set fixed dates for elections, and fulfilled a 2006 promise made by Harper to end the Prime Minister's ability to call snap elections.

On September 17, 2009, the Federal Court of Canada ruled that the election was not unfair, and therefore not illegal. Democracy Watch's appeal to the Federal Court of Appeal was also dismissed, and the Supreme Court denied leave to hear a further appeal.

Target seats
The following is a list of ridings which had narrowly been lost by the indicated party in the 2006 election. For instance, under the Liberal column are the 15 seats in which they came closest to winning but did not. Listed is the name of the riding, followed by the party which was victorious (in parentheses) and the margin, in terms of percentage of the vote, by which the party lost.

These ridings were targeted by the specified party because the party had lost them by a very slim margin in the 2006 election.

Up to 15 are shown, with a maximum margin of victory of 15%.

* Indicates incumbent not running again. To clarify further; this is a list of federal election winners with their party in parentheses, and their margin as a percentage of the vote over the party whose list the seat is on (not the same as the margin of victory if the party potentially "targeting" the seat in that list did not finish second in the previous election). "Won" means that the targeting party won the seat from the incumbent party. "Held" means the incumbent party held the seat.

The Green Party of Canada did not come within 15% of winning any riding in the 2006 election, but came 9.0% short of winning London North Centre, ON (Lib) in a November 2006 by-election.

Targeted Cabinet ministers
The following Cabinet ministers were elected by a margin of less than 10% in 2006:
Tony Clement, Health and Federal Economic Initiative for Northern Ontario: 0.1% over Lib in Parry Sound—Muskoka, ON
Lawrence Cannon, Transport, Infrastructure and Communities: 5.0% over BQ in Pontiac, QC
Jim Flaherty, Finance: 5.7% over Lib in Whitby—Oshawa, ON
Rob Nicholson, Justice: 5.9% over Lib in Niagara Falls, ON
Peter MacKay, Defence and Atlantic Opportunities: 7.8% over NDP in Central Nova, NS
John Baird, Environment: 9.0% over Lib in Ottawa West—Nepean, ON

Potential fall of government

On December 1, 2008, as the result of opposition dissatisfaction with the government's economic update (which failed to include stimulus measures to help the Canadian economy contend with the global crisis and included a 'poison pill' regarding the cessation of public party financing), the leaders of the Liberal Party, New Democratic Party, and Bloc Québécois announced they had reached an agreement to approach the Governor General for the purpose of forming a coalition government. Combined, the three opposition parties constitute a majority of seats in the House of Commons. Parliament was due to vote on a no-confidence motion on December 8; if successful, the Liberals and NDP would have formally asked the Governor General to form a coalition minority government for 30 months, while the BQ pledged to support for at least 18 months. Liberal leader Stéphane Dion would have become prime minister until the selection of his successor at the Liberal leadership convention in May 2009, and a coalition cabinet would have comprised 18 Liberal (including a finance minister) and 6 NDP ministers. Governor General Michaëlle Jean had cut short a state visit to Europe "in light of the current political situation in Canada".
On December 4, 2008, Jean granted Harper's request to prorogue Parliament until January 26, 2009, thereby staving off the prospect of an imminent change in government.

Opinion polls

Endorsements

Candidates by party
Bloc Québécois candidates, 2008 Canadian federal election
Christian Heritage Party candidates, 2008 Canadian federal election
Conservative Party candidates, 2008 Canadian federal election
Green Party candidates, 2008 Canadian federal election
Liberal Party candidates, 2008 Canadian federal election
New Democratic Party candidates, 2008 Canadian federal election

Results

{| class="wikitable" style="text-align:right; font-size: 95%;"
|+ Summary of the October 14, 2008 House of Commons of Canada election results
!rowspan=2 colspan=2 style="text-align:left;" |Party
!rowspan=2 style="text-align:left;" |Party leader
!rowspan=2|
! colspan=5 style="text-align:center;" |Seats
! colspan=4 style="text-align:center;" |Popular vote
|-
| style="text-align:center;" |2006
| style="text-align:center;" |
| style="text-align:center;" |2008
| style="text-align:center;" |
| style="text-align:center;" |% seats
| style="text-align:center;" |#
| style="text-align:center;" |
| style="text-align:center;" |%
| style="text-align:center;" |

| style="text-align:left;" |Stephen Harper
| style="text-align:right;" |307
| style="text-align:right;" |124
| style="text-align:right;" |127
| style="text-align:right;" |143
| style="text-align:right;" |+12.6%
| style="text-align:right;" |46.4%
| style="text-align:right;" |5,209,069 
| style="text-align:right;" |-165,002
| style="text-align:right;" |37.65%
| style="text-align:right;" |+1.38

| style="text-align:left;" |Stéphane Dion
| style="text-align:right;" |307
| style="text-align:right;" |103
| style="text-align:right;" |95
| style="text-align:right;" |77
| style="text-align:right;" |-18.9%
| style="text-align:right;" |25.0%
| style="text-align:right;" |3,633,185 
| style="text-align:right;" |-846,230
| style="text-align:right;" |26.26%
| style="text-align:right;" |-3.97

| style="text-align:left;" |Gilles Duceppe
| style="text-align:right;" |75
| style="text-align:right;" |51
| style="text-align:right;" |48
| style="text-align:right;" |49
| style="text-align:right;" |+2.1%
| style="text-align:right;" |15.9%
| style="text-align:right;" |1,379,991 
| style="text-align:right;" |-173,210
| style="text-align:right;" |9.98%
| style="text-align:right;" |-0.50

| style="text-align:left;" |Jack Layton
| style="text-align:right;" |308
| style="text-align:right;" |29
| style="text-align:right;" |30
| style="text-align:right;" |37
| style="text-align:right;" |+23.3%
| style="text-align:right;" |12.0%
| style="text-align:right;" |2,515,288 
| style="text-align:right;" |-74,309
| style="text-align:right;" |18.18%
| style="text-align:right;" |+0.70

| colspan=2 style="text-align:left;" |Independent and No Affiliation
| style="text-align:right;" |71
| style="text-align:right;" |1
| style="text-align:right;" |3
| style="text-align:right;" |2
| style="text-align:right;" |-33.3%
| style="text-align:right;" |0.6%
| style="text-align:right;" |94,844 
| style="text-align:right;" |+12,984
| style="text-align:right;" |0.69%
| style="text-align:right;" |+0.14

| style="text-align:left;" |Elizabeth May 
| style="text-align:right;" |303
| style="text-align:right;" |-
| style="text-align:right;" |1
| style="text-align:right;" |-
| style="text-align:right;" |-100%
| style="text-align:right;" |-
| style="text-align:right;" |937,613 
| style="text-align:right;" |+273,545
| style="text-align:right;" |6.78%
| style="text-align:right;" |+2.30

| style="text-align:left;" |Ron Gray
| style="text-align:right;" |59
| style="text-align:right;" |-
| style="text-align:right;" |-
| style="text-align:right;" |-
| style="text-align:right;" |-
| style="text-align:right;" |-
| style="text-align:right;" |26,475
| style="text-align:right;" |-1,677
| style="text-align:right;" |0.19%
| style="text-align:right;" |-0.00

| style="text-align:left;" |Anna Di Carlo
| style="text-align:right;" |59
| style="text-align:right;" |-
| style="text-align:right;" |-
| style="text-align:right;" |-
| style="text-align:right;" |-
| style="text-align:right;" |-
| style="text-align:right;" |8,565
| style="text-align:right;" |-415
| style="text-align:right;" |0.06%
| style="text-align:right;" |-0.00

| style="text-align:left;" |Dennis Young
| style="text-align:right;" |26
| style="text-align:right;" |-
| style="text-align:right;" |-
| style="text-align:right;" |-
| style="text-align:right;" |-
| style="text-align:right;" |-
| style="text-align:right;" |7,300
| style="text-align:right;" |+4,298
| style="text-align:right;" |0.05%
| style="text-align:right;" |+0.03

| style="text-align:left;" |Sinclair Stevens
| style="text-align:right;" |10
| style="text-align:right;" |-
| style="text-align:right;" |-
| style="text-align:right;" |-
| style="text-align:right;" |-
| style="text-align:right;" |-
| style="text-align:right;" |5,860
| style="text-align:right;" |-8,291
| style="text-align:right;" |0.04%
| style="text-align:right;" |-0.06

| style="text-align:left;" |Miguel Figueroa
| style="text-align:right;" |24
| style="text-align:right;" |-
| style="text-align:right;" |-
| style="text-align:right;" |-
| style="text-align:right;" |-
| style="text-align:right;" |-
| style="text-align:right;" |3,572
| style="text-align:right;" |+550
| style="text-align:right;" |0.03%
| style="text-align:right;" |+0.01

| style="text-align:left;" |Connie Fogal
| style="text-align:right;" |20
| style="text-align:right;" |-
| style="text-align:right;" |-
| style="text-align:right;" |-
| style="text-align:right;" |-
| style="text-align:right;" |-
| style="text-align:right;" |3,455
| style="text-align:right;" |-2,647
| style="text-align:right;" |0.02%
| style="text-align:right;" |-0.02

| style="text-align:left;" |Blair Longley
| style="text-align:right;" |8
| style="text-align:right;" |-
| style="text-align:right;" |-
| style="text-align:right;" |-
| style="text-align:right;" |-
| style="text-align:right;" |-
| style="text-align:right;" |2,298
| style="text-align:right;" |-6,873
| style="text-align:right;" |0.02%
| style="text-align:right;" |-0.05

| style="text-align:left;" |François Gourd
| style="text-align:right;" |7
| style="text-align:right;" |*
| style="text-align:right;" |-
| style="text-align:right;" |-
| style="text-align:right;" |*
| style="text-align:right;" |-
| style="text-align:right;" |2,122
| style="text-align:right;" |*
| style="text-align:right;" |0.02%
| style="text-align:right;" |*

| style="text-align:left;" |Thomas V. Hickey
| style="text-align:right;" |3
| style="text-align:right;" |*
| style="text-align:right;" |-
| style="text-align:right;" |-
| style="text-align:right;" |*
| style="text-align:right;" |-
| style="text-align:right;" |1,713
| style="text-align:right;" |*
| style="text-align:right;" |0.01%
| style="text-align:right;" |*

| style="text-align:left;" |Barbara Wardlaw
| style="text-align:right;" |6
| style="text-align:right;" |-
| style="text-align:right;" |-
| style="text-align:right;" |-
| style="text-align:right;" |-
| style="text-align:right;" |-
| style="text-align:right;" |1,611
| style="text-align:right;" |+410
| style="text-align:right;" |0.01%
| style="text-align:right;" |+0.00

| style="text-align:left;" |Liz White
| style="text-align:right;" |4
| style="text-align:right;" |-
| style="text-align:right;" |-
| style="text-align:right;" |-
| style="text-align:right;" |-
| style="text-align:right;" |-
| style="text-align:right;" |527
| style="text-align:right;" |+455
| style="text-align:right;" |0.00%
| style="text-align:right;" |+0.00

| style="text-align:left;" |Conrad Schmidt
| style="text-align:right;" |1
| style="text-align:right;" |*
| style="text-align:right;" |-
| style="text-align:right;" |-
| style="text-align:right;" |*
| style="text-align:right;" |-
| style="text-align:right;" |425
| style="text-align:right;" |*
| style="text-align:right;" |0.00%
| style="text-align:right;" |*

| style="text-align:left;" |Western Block
| style="text-align:left;" |Doug Christie
| style="text-align:right;" |1
| style="text-align:right;" |-
| style="text-align:right;" |-
| style="text-align:right;" |-
| style="text-align:right;" |-
| style="text-align:right;" |-
| style="text-align:right;" |195
| style="text-align:right;" |-899
| style="text-align:right;" |0.00%
| style="text-align:right;" |-0.01

| style="text-align:left;" |Roger Poisson
| style="text-align:right;" |2
| style="text-align:right;" |*
| style="text-align:right;" |-
| style="text-align:right;" |-
| style="text-align:right;" |*
| style="text-align:right;" |-
| style="text-align:right;" |186
| style="text-align:right;" |*
| style="text-align:right;" |0.00%
| style="text-align:right;" |*

| style="text-align:left;" colspan=4 |Vacant
| style="text-align:right;" |4
| style="text-align:center;" colspan=7 | 
|-
| style="text-align:left;" colspan=3 |Total
| style="text-align:right;" |1,601
| style="text-align:right;" |308
| style="text-align:right;" |308
| style="text-align:right;" |308
| style="text-align:right;" |±0.0%
| style="text-align:right;" |100
| style="text-align:right;" |13,834,294
| style="text-align:right;" |-982,865
| style="text-align:right;" |100%
| style="text-align:right;" |
|-
| style="text-align:left;" colspan=13 |Source: Elections Canada (2008 data)

Vote and seat summaries

Results by province

Seats that changed hands

Incumbent MPs not running for re-election

Conservatives

Liberals

Bloc Québécois

New Democrats

Vacancies upon dissolution

By-elections in progress in four vacant ridings were cancelled when the general election was called.

Defeated incumbents

Conservatives

Liberals

New Democrats

Bloc Québécois

Greens

Independents

See also

List of Canadian federal general elections
List of political parties in Canada
Federal political financing in Canada
Voter turnout in Canada

Notes

References

Further reading

External links

Projections and predictions
DemocraticSPACE Seat Projections
Election Prediction Project
Trendlines Research  Daily chart tracking of average of 11 Riding Projection models
Paulitics 2008 Election Seat Projection

 
2008 elections in Canada
October 2008 events in Canada